Mister International Korea is an annual national male beauty pageant responsible for selecting South Korea's representatives to the Mister International, Mister Global, Mister Supranational and Man of the World pageant.

The current pageant title holders is KIM Heewon, Mister International Korea 2022.

History 
Previously, the Korean representatives were selected through an online announcement or an unofficial public contest, but in 2013, the tournament was officially held and Kim Jae Hyuk took the first win. The first competition was held in 2013.

International Crowns 

The following are the Mister International Korea titleholders throughout the years.

 One — Mister International crown (2017)
Lee Seung-hwan (2017)
One — Mister Global crown (2019)
Kim Jong-woo (2019)
One — Man of the World crown (2019)
Kim Jin-Kyu (2019)
One — Man of The Year crown (2019)
Lee Ho jin (2019)
One — Mister Friendship International crown (2022)
Yoo Byeong Eun (2022)

 One — Mister Tourism & Culture Universe crown (2018)
Yoo Su Jae (2018)

Titleholders

Representatives to international beauty pageants 
Color keys

Mister International 
The winner of Mister International Korea competes in the Mister International pageant. Sometimes a Runner-up or finalist is sent instead of the winner.

Mister Global 
The Runner-up or finalist of Mister International Korea competes in the Mister Global pageant.

Mister Supranational 
The Runner-up or finalist of Mister International Korea competes in the Mister Supranational pageant.

Man of the World 
The Runner-up or finalist of Mister International Korea competes in the Man of the World pageant.

Mister National Universe

Mister Friendship International

Man Hot Star International

Man of The Year

Mister Tourism & Culture Universe

Mister Landscapes International

Mister Tourism World

Mister Model Worldwide

Mister Model International

Mister Asia

See also 
 Mister International
 Mister Global
 Mister Supranational
 Man of the World

 Miss Korea
 Miss Queen Korea
 Miss Grand Korea
 Mister World Korea

References

External links 
 

South Korean popular culture
Beauty pageants in South Korea
South Korean awards
Annual events in South Korea
Korea
Korea
Korea